Trinity Episcopal Cathedral may refer to:

 Trinity Episcopal Cathedral (Little Rock, Arkansas), listed on the National Register of Historic Places (NRHP)
 Trinity Episcopal Cathedral (Sacramento, California)
 Trinity Episcopal Cathedral (San Jose, California)
 Trinity Episcopal Cathedral (Miami), Florida
 Trinity Episcopal Cathedral (Davenport, Iowa), NRHP-listed
Trinity Episcopal Cathedral (Reno, Nevada)
 Trinity Episcopal Cathedral (Trenton, New Jersey)
 Trinity Episcopal Cathedral (Portland, Oregon)
 Trinity Cathedral (Pittsburgh), Pennsylvania
 Trinity Episcopal Cathedral (Columbia, South Carolina)

See also
 Holy Trinity Cathedral (disambiguation), including Trinity Cathedral
 Trinity Episcopal Church (disambiguation)